Viivi & Wagner is a somewhat absurdist Finnish newspaper gag-a-day comic strip drawn since 1997 by Jussi "Juba" Tuomola.

By June 2022, nearly 25 years after its debut, over 7,300 Viivi & Wagner daily strips had been published, and these were republished as 25 compilation albums. The concept has also been adapted for the stage, as well as for audio books.

Viivi & Wagner has been exported to eg. Sweden, Estonia, Japan and China.

Concept

The titular main characters are Viivi, a Finnish woman in her twenties, and Wagner, a mature male pig. Wagner is fully anthropomorphic and sentient, yet still considers himself a pig instead of a human. Though often mistaken for married, the two are cohabitating in an Odd Couple-ish relationship and genuinely fond of each other when not bickering.

The comic originally appeared in Kultapossu, a promotional children's magazine by a Finnish bank. In the original version of the comic, Viivi was a small girl and Wagner was her animate piggy bank. When the Kultapossu magazine was discontinued, Tuomola adapted the characters to fit a newspaper comic strip style, also changing the characters to adults in the process.

Viivi & Wagner is extremely popular in Finland, above all because of its quirky humour. Most of the strips concern either arguments between Viivi and Wagner ("You ate the wrapper, too?!" "I always eat the wrapper."), or Wagner getting into totally absurd situations, either in everyday life or in a fantasy world ("I'm stuck in the moment before the Big Bang"). Some strips break the fourth wall ("Hey, your outline is loose.") or the classic comic strip format by not having a definite punchline at the end.

Some readers, who have been unaware of the strip's history in a bank's promotional magazine for children, have taken Wagner's porcine appearance as a statement of feminism, specifically implying that "men are pigs". Some have even thought Tuomola was a woman. It has been noticed that many medical inside jokes appear in the strips – many of them originate from an old friend of Juba, whose profession happens to be a doctor.

Albums
, there have been twelve Viivi & Wagner albums:
 Sikspäkki ja salmiakkia ("A six pack and salmiakki), 1998Translated to Swedish as Sexpack och salmiak in 2005
 Apua, sängyssäni on sika! ("Help, there's a pig in my bed!"), 1999Translated to Swedish as Hjälp, jag har en gris i sängen! in 2005
 Ei banaaninkuoria paperikoriin! ("No banana peels in the paper bin!"), 2000
 Oi, mikä karju! ("Oh, what a hog!"), 2001
 Kuumaa hiekkaa ("Hot sand"), 2002
 Viriili vesipeto ("The virile water beast"), 2003
 Sohvaperunoiden kuningas ("The king of the couch potatoes"), 2004
 Ranskalainen liukumäki ("The French slide"), 2005
 Kaasua sohvalla ("Gas on the couch"), 2006
 Sian morsian? ("Bride of a pig?"), 2007
 Terassilla tarkenee ("The terrace is warm enough", 2008)
 Kuinka kasvissyöjä kesytetään ("Taming of the vegetarian", 2009)
 Sika pussaa! ("Pig kissing", 2010)
 Vieläkin yhdessä ("Still together", 2011)
 Vau, kuuma kinkku! ("Wow, hot ham", 2012)
 Sian puolella sänkyä! ("On the pig's side of the bed", 2013)

References

External links
Viivi & Wagner home page
Viivi & Wagner Archive at Helsingin Sanomat
Viivi & Wagner on gocomics.com

Finnish comic strips
1997 comics debuts
Gag-a-day comics
Romance comics
Satirical comics
Fictional Finnish people
Comics characters introduced in 1997
Fictional pigs
Comics about pigs
Comics about married people
Comics magazines published in Finland